Israel was present at the Eurovision Song Contest 1986, held in Bergen, Norway.

Before Eurovision

Kdam Eurovision 1986 
The Israeli national final to select their entry was held on 27 March at the Jerusalem Centre for the Performing Arts in Jerusalem, and was hosted by Daniel Pe'er and Rivka Michaeli. The votes of seven regional juries across Israel decided the winner.

The winning entry was "Yavo Yom" performed by Moti Giladi and Sarai Tzuriel and composed by Yoram Zadok, with lyrics written by Giladi.

Spokespersons
Tel Aviv - Dani Lewinstein
Eilat - Aviva Metz
Jerusalem - 
Golan Heights - Yaakov Belsenbaum
Haifa - Amnon Peer 
Herzliya - 
Or Akiva - Benny Uri

At Eurovision
Moti Giladi and Sarai Tzuriel performed eleventh on the night of the contest, following Switzerland and preceding Ireland. At the close of the voting it had received 7 points, placing 19th in a field of 20 competing countries. Up to that point, it was the worst-ranking song Israel had sent to the Contest, and it would remain so until 1993.

Voting

References

External links
Israeli National Final 1986

1986
Countries in the Eurovision Song Contest 1986
Eurovision